Phonefreak Honey is a song by Birmingham-based band Sweet Jesus, and was their first fully available single.  It was released on Rough Trade Records (catalogue number R284) in 1992.

Information 
Despite a previous release by the band (Honey Loving Honey) earlier in 1992, Phonefreak Honey was the first widely available single (the former was an exclusive Rough Trade Singles Club release).

The title track was produced by Ray Shulman, with the two B-sides being produced by Dave Morris.  Paul Lester, of Melody Maker, described the title track's production in a February 1992 article:

Critical reception 
Phonefreak Honey was Melody Maker's Single of the Week for the issue published on 8 February 1992.

Track listing 
 Phonefreak Honey (2:34)
 Peach (2:53)
 Baby Blue (1:59)

References 

1992 singles
1992 songs
Rough Trade Records singles